Leucanopsis umbrosa is a moth of the family Erebidae. It was described by George Hampson in 1901. It is found in Brazil and French Guiana.

References

 

umbrosa
Moths described in 1901